Raíces ("Roots") is a cover album released by Regional Mexican band Los Tigres del Norte on May 4, 2008. This album became their sixth number-one set on the Billboard Top Latin Albums. It won the Grammy Award for Best Norteño Album at the Grammy Awards of 2009.

Track listing
The information from Billboard.

Personnel
The information from Allmusic.
Hernán Hernández – Production assistant, Voz, Bajo Eléctrico 
Jorge Hernández – Voz, Acordeón
Eduardo Hernández – Voz, Acordeón, Bajo Sexto, Saxophone
Luis Hernández – Voz, Bajo Sexto
Oscar Lara – Batería 
Don C. Tyler – Mastering engineer
Alfonso Ródenas – Engineer, mixing
Joseph Pope – Engineer, mixing
Adriana Rebold – Graphic design, art direction
Pablo Castro – Art direction

Chart performance

References

2008 albums
Los Tigres del Norte albums
Spanish-language albums
Covers albums
Fonovisa Records albums